Pacelli High School is a private, Roman Catholic high school in Columbus, Georgia, United States.  It is located in the Roman Catholic Diocese of Savannah and is the only Catholic high school in southwestern Georgia. The school is connected to St. Anne School, and both schools are governed through a joint system by St. Anne Catholic Church.

History
On March 2, 1958, Holy Family High School was established by Reverend Monsignor Herman J. Deimel, priest at the Church of the Holy Family. Holy Family was the first Roman Catholic high school established in the city of Columbus, attached to Holy Family School (a K‒8 parish school). In late 1958, Thomas Joseph McDonough, Bishop of the Roman Catholic Diocese of Savannah, decided to change the name to honor Pope Pius XII (whose birth name was Eugenio Pacelli).

Pacelli's athletic program began with its first football team, which was established in 1960.

St. Anne Catholic Church was established in 1961 following a Mass being celebrated in the Pacelli cafeteria. The lower school, Holy Family School was changed to St. Anne School, and the new church was connected to it. In the summer of 1980, St. Anne Church and School, along with Pacelli, underwent extensive renovation. This renovation included a new St. Anne church, along with additions to St. Anne School. The original church was turned into a media center/library for Pacelli. A small chapel still remains today in the Pacelli media center, containing six pews, an altar, and a small tabernacle. These renovations concluded with the addition of the Pacelli Sports Arena, a multi-purpose gymnasium. Its name was later changed to the W. Donald Land Sports Arena.

In 1989, construction of the Elena Amos Arts and Science Center was completed. This allowed for the addition of five more classrooms, along with an alumni office. Later that year, Pacelli's fitness center (weight room) was also completed. It was later named after the late Nathan Rustin, a long-time Pacelli football coach. Pacelli expanded again in 1999, with new additions including a fully equipped science lab, updated art studio, renovated kitchen and faculty dining facilities, and new building for administrative offices connected to St. Anne School.

In 2008, plans were finalized to combine Pacelli High School with St. Anne School. The decision to combine the schools came from the recommendation of various committees and St. Anne Catholic Church. Both schools are now governed by St. Anne Church. Pacelli and St. Anne School operate in a unified manner, sharing office workers, admission directors, and other employees.

In 2010, nearly all of Pacelli's athletic facilities received renovations. In 2011, the Nathan Rustin Fitness Center was completely renovated, and additions included new high quality weight lifting and exercise equipment. In May 2012, a donation from the Sisters of Mercy prompted a major renovation of the Pacelli media center/library, which was completed at the end of 2012.

Academics
Pacelli is known locally for its numerous Advanced Placement classes. It offers AP classes in American Government, Biology, Calculus, Chemistry, English Literature, Microeconomics, Statistics, Studio Art, and United States History. As in most schools, students have the option of preparing for AP exams independently, and many do. Students travel to nearby Columbus State University to take their AP exams. Pacelli also offers 19 honors courses.

No strict core curriculum exists, but ninth and tenth graders are offered limited flexibility in their courses. Juniors and seniors are freer, selecting electives and other courses.

Graduation requirements
Pacelli students entering grade 9 must earn a minimum of 24 Carnegie credits. Students must take one core course each year in English, math, science, social studies, and religion. All students are also required to earn one credit in fine arts, as well as 1/2 credits in both health and physical education.

Community service
Each year, students must complete community service projects as part of religion class. 9th graders are required to do two projects per semester while 10th, 11th, and 12th graders are required to do three. Seniors are also required to do a senior project. To earn full credit for the projects, students must turn in a journal of each experience. The project portion of the students' Religion grade is 10% of their final average.

Activities

Athletics

Pacelli has competed in different regions and classifications under the Georgia High School Association as PHS has grown through the years:
 1961-63: 3-C
 1964-67: 3-South-B
 1968-69: 5-South-B
 1970-77: 5-B
 1978-97: 5-A
 1998-99: 3-A
 2000-05: 2-A
 2006-: 4-A

 V = Varsity, JV = Junior varsity

GHSA state championships
 Baseball - 2008
 Golf - 2007 (girls')
 Softball - 2002
 Cross country - 1980, 1982, 1986, 1989-91 (boys'); 1984, 1986-87 (girls')

GHSA Class A Region Championships

 Baseball - 1983, 1984, 1991, 1993, 2001, 2002, 2006, 2008
 Cheerleading - 2002
 Cross country - 2002, 2004, 2007, 2010, 2011, 2012 (girls'); 1979–82, 1986, 1989–91, 2002 (boys')
 Football - 1970, 1975, 2003, 2004
 Golf - 2006 (boys'), 2008 (girls')
 Soccer - 1990, 1997, 2003, 2008,  2009, 2016, 2017, 2018 (boys'); 1998 (girls')
 Softball - 2003, 2004, 2008, 2012
 Tennis - 1993 (boys')
 Track - 2008 (girls')
 Boys Basketball -2021 (Boys’)

Pacelli-Brookstone rivalry

Pacelli's biggest rival is Brookstone High School, located in North Columbus ( north of Pacelli's Midtown campus). Although Pacelli plays Brookstone in all of their sports, the most popular rivalry is their yearly football game, dubbed the "Battle for the Jug". The winner of this game gets to keep the "Broocelli Jug" (a milk jug painted red and blue) at their campus for the next year, along with bragging rights. In 2013, Pacelli received the jug for the first time since 2004 in a 14–7 win. The rivalry first began in 1972, and Brookstone leads the series 27–17–1.

Clubs and organizations

Pacelli features student-led clubs and organizations. They include the following:

Notable alumni
 Jeff Beeland, Oscar winner for visual effects for the movie Life of Pi
 Donna D'Errico, actress and model
 Matt Dunham, professional football player, Columbus Lions
 Mark LeGree, professional football player
 Michael O'Neal,  baseball player, Atlanta Braves
 Ed Jenkins, professional duck hunter
Allen Brinkman,  CEO of INB Florida, and founder of 1858 Investment Bank, Founder of Hawksix NFP low income community restoration. Former Chairman and CEO of SunTrust Bank West Florida Division, Former President of Seacoast Bank.

See also

 National Catholic Educational Association

Notes and references

External links
 School website
 Roman Catholic Diocese of Savannah

Catholic secondary schools in Georgia (U.S. state)
Educational institutions established in 1958
High schools in Columbus, Georgia
1958 establishments in Georgia (U.S. state)